Die  is a 2010 Canadian-Italian thriller film written by Domenico Salvaggio and directed by Dominic James and starring Elias Koteas and Emily Hampshire.

Plot 
Six strangers wake up in cells in an underground facility. Their captive decides their fate with the roll of a die.

Cast

References

External links  

2010 thriller films
2010 films
Canadian thriller films
Italian thriller films
2010 directorial debut films
English-language Italian films
2010s English-language films
2010s Canadian films
2010s Italian films